Paşakonağı can refer to:

 Paşakonağı, Baskil
 Paşakonağı, Düzce